"Kärleken väntar" (Swedish for Love Awaits) is a song by Swedish alternative rock band Kent. It was released as the second single from their fifth album Vapen & Ammunition on 8 July 2002. It includes the b-side "Lämnar". The tiger theme continues on the sleeve with more photos taken by Jonas Linell.

Track listing

Charts

References

Kent (band) songs
2002 singles
2012 singles
Songs written by Joakim Berg